Mata Abajo is a settlement in Cuba near Guantánamo Bay, located in the municipality of Caimanera, near the borders with Guantánamo. Its name, in Spanish, means "Plant Below".

See also
Boquerón
List of cities in Cuba

References

Populated places in Guantánamo Province